Cochylis fidens is a species of moth of the family Tortricidae. It is found in Minas Gerais, Brazil.

The wingspan is about 10 mm. The ground colour of the forewings is yellowish creamy densely spotted and strigulated (finely streaked) with pale brownish creamy or greyish creamy. The hindwings are pale brownish grey, browner on periphery and with darker venation.

References

Moths described in 2002
Cochylis